A referendum on extending the presidential term of Nursultan Nazarbayev was held in Kazakhstan on 29 April 1995. Voters were asked "Do you agree to prolong the term of office of the President of the Republic of Kazakhstan Nursultan Nazarbayev, publicly elected on 1 December 1991, until 1 December 2000?" The question was approved by 95.5% of voters, with turnout reported to be 91.2%.

Results

References

1995 referendums
1995 in Kazakhstan
Referendums in Kazakhstan
Nursultan Nazarbayev